Palzer may refer to:

 29148 Palzer, outer main-belt asteroid
 Palzer (surname), German-language surname